The 2006 Atlantic Sun Conference baseball tournament was held at Melching Field at Conrad Park on the campus of Stetson University in DeLand, Florida, from May 25 through 27. Stetson won its sixth tournament championship, and second in a row, to earn the Atlantic Sun Conference's automatic bid to the 2006 NCAA Division I baseball tournament.

Seeding 
The top six teams (based on conference results) from the conference earn invites to the tournament. Kennesaw State and North Florida were ineligible for the tournament due to NCAA rules after reclassifying to Division I.

Results 

* - Indicates game required 11 innings.

All-Tournament Team 
The following players were named to the All-Tournament Team.

Tournament Most Valuable Player 
Brandon Paritz was named Tournament Most Valuable Player. Paritz was an infielder for Stetson.

References 

Tournament
ASUN Conference Baseball Tournament
Atlantic Sun baseball tournament
Atlantic Sun baseball tournament